María Dolores Pérez Enciso (1908 in Almería, Andalusia, Spain – 1949 in Mexico City) was a writer and journalist.

She began her studies of education in Almería and then in Barcelona. After a brief marriage to Francisco del Olmo, she joined the Communist Party and during the Spanish Civil War she acted as Delegate of the Republic. After the end of the civil war, she relocated with her daughter to Colombia because of World War II, then in Cuba and finally in Mexico where she joined the thousands of scientists, artists and intellectuals that arrived the previous years.

In Mexico she wrote for the magazine Paquita del Jueves and for the newspaper El Nacional. She reunited with another Andalusian writer, Mercedes Rull, who she had met in Cuba.

Publications
 Treinta estampas de la guerra (1941)
 Un recuerdo del horror con unas palabras (1942)
 IsabelleBlume (1942)
 Cristal de las horas (1942)
 Raíz al viento (1947)

External links
  Biography

1908 births
1949 deaths
People from Almería
Spanish emigrants to Mexico
Spanish women writers
Mexican women journalists
Spanish women journalists
20th-century Mexican women writers
20th-century Mexican writers